Norman Thomas Hatch (March 2, 1921 – April 22, 2017) was a veteran of the U.S. Marine Corps who filmed much of the combat footage used in the documentary film With the Marines at Tarawa.

Early life
Hatch was born in Boston, Massachusetts, and grew up in nearby Gloucester.

Military service

In 1939, Hatch joined the Marine Corps.

In November 1943, he was part of the Battle of Tarawa, and waded ashore with other Marines. Hatch used a Bell & Howell Eyemo to film the invasion and the ensuing combat.

Civilian career
After the war, Hatch worked for the U.S. Department of Defense as a civilian.

References

External links

Norman Hatch oral history, Veterans History Project of the Library of Congress American Folklife Center
Norman Hatch oral history, The National WWII Museum

1921 births
2017 deaths
United States Marine Corps personnel of World War II
Battle of Tarawa
War photographers
People from Gloucester, Massachusetts
People from Alexandria, Virginia
Burials at Arlington National Cemetery
United States Marines